North Frisians are the inhabitants of the district of Nordfriesland in the north German state of Schleswig-Holstein. Used in a narrower sense, the term also refers to an ethnic sub-group of the Frisians from the region of North Frisia, which lies primarily on the German North Sea coast, and on the island of Heligoland. 

The North Frisians live on the west coast of Schleswig-Holstein – from the German-Danish border region in the north to the more southern town of Bredstedt in the district of North Friesland. The North Frisian language area also includes the offshore islands of Sylt, Föhr, Amrum and Heligoland (in the district of Pinneberg) and a number of smaller islands, the Halligen.

The North Frisians still to some extent use the different dialects of the North Frisian language, which forms part of the group of Anglo-Frisian languages. This language is specially protected by the Schleswig-Holstein state constitution and by the Friisk Gesäts (German: Friesisch-Gesetz) or "Frisian Law". 

Around 800 AD, the Frisians migrated into what later became Uthlande in the Duchy of Schleswig. Initially they only settled the offshore islands but, in a second wave of immigration around 1100, also populated the adjacent coastal strip between the rivers Eider and Vidå (German: Wiedau) on the Germano-Danish border.

The colours gold, red and blue, like the coat of arms of North Frisia (which are not the same as those of the district of Nordfriesland), have been accorded official status by the Friisk Gesäts.

See also
Saterland Frisians
East Frisians
West Frisians

References

External links 
 Information about the Frisian people (Parliament of Schleswig-Holstein) 
 Friisk Foriining 
 The North Frisian Society 
 Nordfriisk Instituut 

 
German Frisians
Danish Frisian people